Disphyma crassifolium, commonly known as round-leaved pigface, is a species of flowering plant in the family Aizoaceae and is native to Australia and the Cape Provinces of South Africa.

Description

Taxonomy
Disphyma crassifolium was first published in 1753 as Mesembryanthemum crassifolium by Carl Linnaeus in Species Plantarum from species collected in southern Africa. In 1925, Nicholas Edward Brown raised the genus Disphyma in The Gardeners' Chronicle and in 1927 Harriet Margaret Louisa Bolus moved Linnaeus's M. crassifolium into the new genus as Disphyma crassifolium in the botanical magazine Flowering Plants of South Africa.

In 1803, Adrian Hardy Haworth described Mesmbryanthemum clavellatum in his book Miscellanea Naturalia, sive Dissertationes Variae ad Historiam Naturalem Spectantes from plants raised from seed collected in Australia by Robert Brown. In 1976, Robert Chinnock moved M. clavellatum to the genus Disphyma as D. clavellatum in the New Zealand Journal of Botany. Then, in 1986, John Peter Jessop reduced Disphyma clavellatum to a subspecies, Disphyma crassifolium subsp. clavellatum in Flora of South Australia, a name accepted by the Australian Plant Census and Plants of the World Online.

Distribution and habitat
Disphyma crassifolium is widely distributed in South Africa and Australia. It grows in saline areas such as coastal dunes and samphire flats, and tolerates a range of soils including sand, loam and clay.

References

Aizoaceae
Plants described in 1753
Flora of Australia
Flora of the Cape Provinces
Taxa named by Carl Linnaeus